The Zee Cine Award Best Film is chosen via the public of India. The winners are announced in March.

Winners and nominees

See also
 Zee Cine Awards
 Bollywood
 Cinema of India

Notes

References

Film
Awards for best film